William Inglis Lindon Travers  (3 January 1922 – 29 March 1994) was a British actor, screenwriter, director and animal rights activist. Prior to his show business career, he served in the British Army with Gurkha and special forces units.

Early life
Travers was born in the suburb of Jesmond in the city of Newcastle upon Tyne, England, the son of Florence (née Wheatley) and William Halton Lindon Travers, a theatre manager. His sister Linden (1913–2001) and her daughter Susan became actresses.

Military service

Travers enlisted as a private in the British Army at the age of 18, a few months after the outbreak of the Second World War, and was sent to India then under British Raj rule. He was commissioned as a 2nd lieutenant in the British Indian Army on 9 July 1942.  
 
He served in the Long Range Penetration Brigade 4th Battalion 9th Gorkha Rifles in Burma, attached to Orde Wingate's staff, during which he came to know John Masters, his brigade major. (Travers later acted in the film Bhowani Junction, written by Masters.) While deep behind enemy lines, he contracted malaria and volunteered to be left behind in a native Burmese village. To avoid capture, he disguised himself as a Chinese national and walked hundreds of miles through jungle territory until he reached an Allied position.

In 1945, Travers was promoted to the rank of major, and he joined Force 136 Special Operations Executive and was parachuted into Malaya. He was responsible for training and tactical decisions with the main resistance movement, the communist-led Malayan People’s Anti-Japanese Army (MPAJA).

Travers was one of the first allied operatives to enter the Japanese city of Hiroshima after the dropping of the atomic bomb. He wrote about his experience in his diary, registering profound horror at the destruction and loss of life. He left the armed forces in 1947.

On 7 November 1946 Travers was appointed a Member of the Order of the British Empire (MBE) "in recognition of gallant and distinguished service whilst engaged in Special Operations in South East Asia".

Acting career

Early work
After leaving the army, Travers decided to become an actor. He began working on stage in 1949 appearing in John Van Druten's The Damask Cheek, and a year later made his film debut in Conspirator (1949). He had unbilled parts in Trio (1950) and The Wooden Horse (1950). He had a slightly bigger part in The Browning Version (1951) and a good role on TV in "Albert" (later filmed as Albert R.N.) for BBC Sunday-Night Theatre (1951).

Supporting player
Travers appeared in Hindle Wakes (1952), The Planter's Wife (1952), The Story of Robin Hood and His Merrie Men (1952), It Started in Paradise (1952), Mantrap (1953), Street of Shadows (1953), and The Square Ring (1953). He was in "The Heel" for Douglas Fairbanks Presents.

He was a supporting player in Counterspy (1953), and appeared in Romeo and Juliet (1954) as Benvolio, and in Footsteps in the Fog (1955) starring Stewart Granger and Jean Simmons.

Geordie and MGM 
Travers's breakthrough came when he was cast in the title role of Geordie (1955), directed by Frank Launder. This was popular in Britain and the US and saw him contracted by Metro-Goldwyn-Mayer, which thought he was going to be a big star and brought him to Hollywood. 

MGM cast him in the expensive epic Bhowani Junction (1956), with Granger and Ava Gardner. He followed this as the romantic lead in a remake of The Barretts of Wimpole Street (1957), opposite Jennifer Jones. Powell and Pressburger wanted him to star in the lead of Ill Met by Moonlight but the role went to Dirk Bogarde. Travers briefly returned to Britain to make a comedy, The Smallest Show on Earth (1957), with his second wife Virginia McKenna, whom he had married in 1957.

Back in Hollywood, he was Eleanor Parker's character's love interest in The Seventh Sin (1957), a remake of a Greta Garbo film. MGM tested him for the lead in Ben-Hur (1959) and he wrote a swashbuckler to star himself, The Falcon. However his MGM films all performed disappointingly at the box office – Barretts and Seventh Sign were notable flops – and enthusiasm for Travers in Hollywood cooled.

Travers did "A Cook for Mr. General" for Kraft Theatre (1958) on TV. Then he returned to Britain.

Return to Britain
Travers and McKenna starred in a melodrama for the Rank Organisation, Passionate Summer (1958). He tried to get up a war film set in Greenland, The Sledge Patrol, but it does not appear to have been made. He and Launder tried to repeat the success of Geordie with The Bridal Path (1960), but the film was not a success.

Travers did "Born a Giant" for Our American Heritage (1960) on TV, then returned to Britain where he made a British monster film, Gorgo (1961). Travers and McKenna reteamed on a thriller, Two Living, One Dead (1961). He then starred in a race car drama for MGM, The Green Helmet (1961), and a comedy with Spike Milligan, Invasion Quartet (1961).

He was in a Broadway production of A Cook for Mr General (1961). Travers starred in a TV adaptation of Lorna Doone (1963). He returned to Hollywood to do some episodes of The Everglades, Rawhide ("Incident at Two Graves") and Espionage ("A Camel to Ride"). Back on Broadway he played the title role in Abraham Cochrane which had a short run.

Born Free
His most famous film role was that of game warden George Adamson in the highly successful 1966 film Born Free, about which experience the two co-wrote the book On Playing with Lions. He co-starred with McKenna and the experience made him and his wife conscious of the many abuses of wild animals in captivity that had been taken from Africa and other natural environments around the world. 

Travers received an offer to play a support role in Duel at Diablo (1967); during filming he broke a leg and dislocated a shoulder. He played the title role in a British TV version of The Admirable Crichton (1968), alongside his wife, and had a small part in Peter Hall's adaptation of A Midsummer Night's Dream (1968).

Documentaries
Travers teamed up with James Hill, the director of Born Free, to make the documentary, The Lions Are Free (1969), which both men directed.

Travers and McKenna made another "animal movie", Ring of Bright Water (1969) for which he also wrote the script. They followed this with An Elephant Called Slowly (1970), which Travers helped write and produce with James Hill, who directed. In 1969, he played Captain Hook on a stage production of Peter Pan.

Travers worked as an actor only on Rum Runners (1971) with Brigitte Bardot and Lino Ventura. He directed and appeared in a documentary, The Lion at World's End (1971), about Christian the lion, an animal bought in Harrods and then returned to Africa.

He was reunited with James Hill on The Belstone Fox (1973) and co-wrote a documentary, "The Wild Dogs of Africa", for The World About Us (1973). He later produced "The Baboons of Gombe" (1975) for the same show.

He and Hill wrote and produced The Queen's Garden (1977) together, and Travers helped produce Bloody Ivory (1980).

Later years
Travers appeared in "Tramps and Poachers", an episode of To the Manor Born (1980). In The First Olympics: Athens 1896 (1984) he and McKenna played the parents of Edwin Flack.

One of his last credits was "Highland Fling" on Lovejoy (1992).

Animal rights campaigner
The importance of animal rights led to Travers and his wife becoming involved in the "Zoo Check Campaign" in 1984 that evolved to their establishing the Born Free Foundation in 1991. 

Travers spent his last three years travelling around Europe's slum zoos and a TV documentary that he made exposed the appalling suffering of thousands of animals.

Death
Travers died from a coronary thrombosis in his sleep at his home in the village of South Holmwood, near Dorking, Surrey, aged 72.  He was survived by his wife and children. His widow, Virginia McKenna, carries on his work to help suffering animals, as does their son, Will Travers, who is president of the Born Free Foundation.

Credits

Filmography

 Conspirator (1949) - Mnor Role (undetermined, uncredited role)
 Trio (1950) - Fellowes (segment "Mr. Know-All")
 The Wooden Horse (1950) - Prisoner (uncredited)
 The Browning Version (1951) - Fletcher
 The Story of Robin Hood and His Merrie Men (1952) - Posse Man
 The Planter's Wife (1952) - Planter (uncredited)
 It Started in Paradise (1952) - 2nd Photographer (uncredited)
 Hindle Wakes (1952) - Bob
 Mantrap (1953) - Victor Tasman
 Street of Shadows (1953) - Nigel Langley
 The Genie (1953) - Morgan (segment "The Heel")
 The Square Ring (1953) - Rowdie Rawlings
 Counterspy (1953) - Rex
 Romeo and Juliet (1954) - Benvolio
 Footsteps in the Fog (1955) - David Macdonald
 Geordie (1955) - Geordie MacTaggart
 Bhowani Junction (1956) - Patrick Taylor
 The Barretts of Wimpole Street (1957) - Robert Browning
 The Smallest Show on Earth (1957) - Matt Spenser
 The Seventh Sin (1957) - Walter Carwin
 Passionate Summer, aka Storm Over Jamaica (1958) - Douglas Lockwood
 The Bridal Path (1959) - Ewan McEwan
 Gorgo (1961) - Joe
 Two Living, One Dead (1961) - Andersson
 The Green Helmet (1961) - Greg Rafferty
 The Invasion Quartet (1961) - Freddie Oppenheimer
 Born Free (1966, as wildlife expert George Adamson) - George Adamson
 Duel at Diablo (1966) - Lt. Scotty McAllister
 The Admirable Crichton (1967, TV Movie) - Crichton
 A Midsummer Night's Dream (1968) - Snout
 The Lions are Free (1969, Documentary) - Himself in the real-life sequel to Born Free. 
 Ring of Bright Water (1969) - Graham Merrill
 An Elephant Called Slowly (1970) - Bill
 The Lion at World's End (1971, Documentary) - Himself
 Rum Runners (1971) - Sanderson
 The Belstone Fox (1973) - Tod
 How to Handle a Wine (1984, Documentary) - Himself / Dinner Guest

Television 
 The Everglades as Rand in "The Hostage", syndicated US television series (1962)
 Lorna Doone, as John Ridd, 11 episodes (1963 TV series)
 Rawhide as Jeremiah O'Neal in "Incident at Two Graves" (1963)
 To the Manor Born, as Arthur Smith (Tramp) in Tramps and Poachers, 1980, series 2 number 4
 Lovejoy, BBC, two episodes 1992 (final appearance)

References

External links

 
 Photos of Bill Travers, Virginia McKenna and George Adamson and Lions.
 Obituary: Bill Travers
 Bill Travers, 72, Actor Who Starred In Film 'Born Free'

1922 births
1994 deaths
Deaths from coronary thrombosis 
British Indian Army officers
English activists
English male film actors
English male stage actors
Male actors from Newcastle upon Tyne
Military personnel from Newcastle upon Tyne
Male actors from Northumberland
Members of the Order of the British Empire
20th-century English male actors
Special Operations Executive personnel
British Army soldiers
British Army personnel of World War II
Indian Army personnel of World War II